Robin Dunne (born November 19, 1976) is a Canadian actor who has had numerous leading roles in sequels throughout his career, but is perhaps best known for his role as Doctor Will Zimmerman in the science fiction television series Sanctuary.

Personal life
Robin Dunne was born in Toronto, Ontario, Canada and attended the Etobicoke School of the Arts. Robin Dunne's mother is a native of Dublin in the Republic of Ireland. 

He was married to actress Heidi Lenhart, but divorced under pressures of living in Hollywood.

In 2016, he married co-star Farrah Aviva on the sets of their movie Welcome to Nowhere.  In March 2021 the couple welcomed their first child, a daughter.

Career 
One of Dunne's earliest starring roles was as Franz Bhaer in the television series Little Men from 1998–99. He also starred in UPN's short-lived As If as well as recurring guest roles on Dawson's Creek and Dead Like Me. Dunne has also appeared in NCIS.

His most notable movie role was the character Sebastian Valmont in Cruel Intentions 2. He has also appeared in The Skulls II, American Psycho 2 and Just Friends. Additionally, Dunne appeared in the made-for-television films Jewel, Au Pair II, Roughing It, Species III and Code Breakers. Dunne also portrayed Robin Hood in the television film Beyond Sherwood Forest, directed by Peter DeLuise, starring alongside Erica Durance.

Beginning in 2007, Dunne co-starred with Amanda Tapping in the science fiction/fantasy series Sanctuary which premiered as a series of eight webisodes before being commissioned as a conventional TV series by Syfy in the U.S. The series was broadcast on many international free-to-air and cable networks. For this role he was nominated for a Leo Award in the Best Lead Performance by a Male in a Dramatic Series category and won in 2010.

On May 6, 2013 Dunne appeared in an episode of Defiance as Miko. He returned to the show in 2014 in a recurring role as Mordecai, an Irathient lawyer and apparent reincarnation of an ancient astronaut of the same species.

In addition to his acting career, Dunne has also co-written the Roxy Hunter franchise for Nickelodeon. The first two films, Roxy Hunter and the Mystery of the Moody Ghost and Roxy Hunter and the Secret of the Shaman, were shot in 2005. These films spawned a successful franchise that has led to his co-writing the third and fourth installments in the series Roxy Hunter and the Myth of the Mermaid and Roxy Hunter and the Horrific Halloween. He has also co-authored the novels for Penguin Books.

Filmography

Film

Television

Other

References

External links 
 
 

1976 births
20th-century Canadian male actors
21st-century Canadian male actors
Canadian male film actors
Canadian male television actors
Canadian male voice actors
Canadian people of Irish descent
Living people
Male actors from Toronto